André Johannpeter (born 17 March 1963 in Porto Alegre) is a Brazilian businessman currently serving as CEO of Gerdau, the largest steel producer of Latin America. He is a former Olympic equestrian.

Early life and education
André Bier Gerdau Johannpeter was born in Porto Alegre, March 17, 1963. He is the son of businessman Jorge Gerdau Johannpeter, chairman of the Board of Directors of Gerdau, and Erica Bier.

Johannpeter obtained a bachelor's degree in Business Administration from Pontifícia Universidade Católica do Rio Grande do Sul  and completed his academic training with courses in General Business Administration from University of Toronto, Canada, Marketing from Ashridge Business School (now part of Hult International Business School) and the Advanced Management Program from Wharton School, in University of Pennsylvania, United States.

Career
Johannpeter began his career at sixteen, as an assistant plant operator in the Gerdau Group. He has worked for Gerdau since 1980.

In 1989, he was appointed Executive Officer of Gerdau SA where he served until he became Director of Information Systems in 1998. After a year, he became Director of New Business Development before he was appointed as Vice President, North American Operations. In November 2003, he served as Vice President of Business Development.

From July 2004 to March 2006, Johannpeter served as the Chief Operating Officer. Since January 2007, he has served as President and Chief Executive Officer.

At the beginning of 2008, he became a member of the Board of Directors. He is also a member of the Strategy Committee of the Board of Directors. In addition, since January 1, 2007, he has served as President Officer and president of the Executive Committee of the parent company Metalurgica Gerdau S.A. and President Officer of the subsidiary Seiva S.A Florestas Industrias.

In 2018, Johannpeter stepped down as CEO. He was succeeded by Gustavo Werneck.

Lawsuit
First in March 2015 and again in February 2016, Gerdau's offices in São Paulo, Brasília, Rio de Janeiro, Recife and Porto Alegre, the company's headquarters, were raided by the Brazilian federal police. As part of Operation Zealots, a probe into tax fraud, Gerdau was summoned to testify on suspicion that "executives bribed tax authorities, defrauded Brazil's tax revenue service of $429 million, laundered illegal funds and carried out influence peddling". In its defense, the company said in a securities filing it had legally hired external experts for technical advise. However, Johannpeter agreed to appear in court voluntarily.

Additional affiliations and memberships 
In September 2018, the World Steel Association elected Johannpeter als chairman of the board.

Olympic career
As an equestrian, Johannpeter won a bronze medal in show jumping, with horse Calei, at the 1996 Summer Olympics in Atlanta. At the 2000 Summer Olympics in Sydney he again won a bronze medal, once again with horse Calei, with the Brazilian team, and placed fourth in the individual contest.

Personal life 
Johannpeter is married to Maria Teresa Campos, they have three children.

References

1963 births
Living people
Brazilian chief executives
Wharton School of the University of Pennsylvania alumni
Hult International Business School alumni
University of Toronto alumni
Sportspeople from Porto Alegre
Brazilian male equestrians
Olympic medalists in equestrian
Olympic equestrians of Brazil
Olympic bronze medalists for Brazil
Equestrians at the 1988 Summer Olympics
Equestrians at the 1996 Summer Olympics
Equestrians at the 2000 Summer Olympics
Medalists at the 2000 Summer Olympics
Medalists at the 1996 Summer Olympics
Gerdau family
Pan American Games medalists in equestrian
Pan American Games gold medalists for Brazil
Equestrians at the 1991 Pan American Games
Medalists at the 1991 Pan American Games
Medalists at the 1995 Pan American Games
Medalists at the 1999 Pan American Games